Asit Kumar Mal is an Indian politician. He was elected to the Lok Sabha, lower house of the Parliament of India from Bolpur, West Bengal in the 2019 Indian general election as a member of the All India Trinamool Congress.

References

External links
Official biographical sketch in Parliament of India website

India MPs 2019–present
Living people
1955 births
Trinamool Congress politicians from West Bengal
People from Birbhum district